Still Waters ( is 2000 Russian romantic comedy-drama directed by Eldar Ryazanov.

Plot
Anton M. Kashtanov (Alexander Abdulov) is a talented surgeon and head of a large clinic. He decides to escape his domineering and bad-tempered wife Pauline in the village of Still Waters. Here he reconnects with his childhood friend, the head of the local nature reserve. This pastoral idyll is unsettled by one matter: at the time of Kashtanov's departure two million dollars have disappeared from his foundation.

Two strong women launch independent investigations: a police detective and a TV reporter...

Cast
 Alexander Abdulov - academician Anton M. Kashtanov
 Oksana Korostishevskaya - journalist Eugenie Tobolskaya (Jackie)
 Lyubov Polishchuk - Pauline, Kashtanov's wife
 Jan Tsapnik - Vlad, the operator
 Olga Volkova - Varvara Petrovna Muromova, police detective
 Andrey Makarevich - forester
 Andrey Smolyakov - Ivan Pavlovich, Kashtanov's assistant
 Michael Dorozhkin - Nikita, Kashtanov's son from his first marriage
 Anatoly Lobotsky - Alexey Yozhikov, businessman
 Marat Basharov - traffic cop
 Alexander Pashutin - hotel employee
 Alexander Nevsky - bodyguard
 Olga Pogodina - girl smoking on balcony
 Olga Chekov - radiologist assistant
 Eldar Ryazanov - radiologist (Ryazanov was also the film's director)

Facts
Eldar Ryazanov said that the character of Kashtanov was modeled after Anton Chekhov.
The film was banned in Ukraine because Jan Tsapnik was declared as a danger to the country.

References

External links

The romantic comedy "Still Waters" at Exler film reviews 

2000 romantic comedy-drama films
2000 films
Films directed by Eldar Ryazanov
Russian romantic comedy-drama films
2000s Russian-language films